James Bryan McCollum, also known as James Bryan, is a Canadian musician, songwriter, and music producer. McCollum is a guitarist for The Philosopher Kings and Prozzäk.

Background
McCollum was born in Ottawa, Ontario and was raised in St. Catharines, Ontario.  McCollum attended the University of Toronto, and left university after his second year to perform with The Philosopher Kings.

Collaborations
McCollum has written, produced or performed on songs for the following performers:

 Maestro
 Marc Jordan
 Molly Johnson
 jacksoul
 b4-4
 Nelly Furtado
 Sugar Jones
 Kaci Battaglia
 EyeQ
 Fefe Dobson
 Ivana Santilli
 Billy Klippert
 Mychael Danna
 Nicole Henry
 Matt Dusk
 Lisa Marie Presley
 Maria Gadú
 Martin Garrix
 Divine Brown
 K'naan
 Kreesha Turner
 Shakura S'Aida
 Olly Murs
 Greyson Chance
 Dotan
 Emma's Imagination
 Engelbert Humperdinck
 Shane Filan
 Zaz
 Saint Lu
 James Blunt
 Fallulah
 Backstreet Boys
 Kate Ceberano
 Luis Fonsi
 Shawn Mendes
 Lowell
 Nikki Yanofsky
 Raleigh Ritchie
 Femme Schmidt

From 2007 to 2008, McCollum performed guitar for Nelly Furtado on her Get Loose Tour.

Award nominations
In 2001, McCollum and Jason Levine were nominated for the Juno Award for Best Producer for their production of the b4-4 single "Get Down" and the Prozzak single "www.nevergetoveryou".

References

External links
James Bryan's Official Website

Living people
Canadian male guitarists
Canadian record producers
Musicians from Ottawa
Musicians from St. Catharines
20th-century Canadian guitarists
21st-century Canadian guitarists
20th-century Canadian male musicians
21st-century Canadian male musicians
Year of birth missing (living people)